The 1979 Major League Baseball First-Year Player Draft was held on June 5–7, 1979, via conference call.

First round selections

The following are the first round picks in the 1979 Major League Baseball draft.

* Did not sign

Compensation Picks

Other notable selections
Later rounds of the draft included the following notable players:

Milt Thompson, 2nd round, 29th overall Atlanta Braves
Dan Marino, 4th round, 99th overall Kansas City Royals
Mark Thurmond, 5th round, 118th overall San Diego Padres
Ron Gardenhire, 6th round, 132nd overall New York Mets
Bill Doran, 6th round, 138th overall Houston Astros
Harold Reynolds, 6th round, 144th overall San Diego Padres (did not sign)
Von Hayes†, 7th round 163rd overall Cleveland Indians
Johnny Ray, 12th round, 294th overall Houston Astros
Pete O'Brien, 15th round 381st overall Texas Rangers
Bud Black, 17th round, 417th overall Seattle Mariners
Orel Hershiser†, 17th round, 440th overall Los Angeles Dodgers
John Elway, 18th round, 463rd overall Kansas City Royals (did not sign)
Don Mattingly†, 19th round, 493rd overall New York Yankees
Brett Butler†, 23rd round, 573 overall Atlanta Braves
Curt Warner, 32nd round, 784th overall Philadelphia Phillies

† All-Star  
‡ Hall of Famer

A number of future football players were drafted in 1979, including John Elway (Kansas City), Kevin House (St. Louis),  Dan Marino (Kansas City), Jay Schroeder (Toronto), Jack Thompson (Seattle), and Curt Warner (Philadelphia).

See also

References

External links 
Complete draft list from The Baseball Cube database

Major League Baseball draft
Draft
Major League Baseball draft